Mordellistena testaceimembris is a species of beetle in the genus Mordellistena of the family Mordellidae. It was described by Píc in 1926.

References

External links
Coleoptera. BugGuide.

Beetles described in 1926
testaceimembris